Harry Innes was a US federal judge.

Harry Innes may also refer to:

Sir Harry Innes, 4th Baronet (c. 1670-1721), Scottish politician and baronet
Sir Harry Innes, 5th Baronet (died 1762), of the Innes baronets

See also
Henry Innes, Scottish peer and courtier